Hibbertia microphylla is a species of flowering plant in the family Dilleniaceae and is endemic to the south-west of Western Australia. It is a shrub with weakly ascending stems, broadly egg-shaped to elliptic leaves and yellow flowers, usually with ten stamens and up to nine staminodes arranged on one side of, and leaning over the two densely hairy carpels.

Description
The leaves curve downwards and the edges are rolled under, obscuring most of the lower surface. There are usually ten stamens, arranged on one side of, and leaning over the two densely softly-hairy carpels that each contain a two ovules. Flowering occurs from mid-September to early December.

Taxonomy
Hibbertia microphylla was first formally described in 1845 by Ernst Gottlieb von Steudel in Johann Georg Christian Lehmann's  Plantae Preissianae. The specific epithet (microphylla) means "small-leaved".

Distribution and habitat
This hibbertia grows in kwongan, mallee-heath and forest in the Avon Wheatbelt Esperance Plains, Jarrah Forest Mallee and Warren biogeographic regions in the south-west of Western Australia.

Conservation status
Hibbertia microphylla is classified as "not threatened" by the Western Australian Government Department of Parks and Wildlife.

See also
List of Hibbertia species

References

microphylla
Flora of Western Australia
Plants described in 1845
Taxa named by Ernst Gottlieb von Steudel